Belle International Holdings Limited is a women's shoe retailer in China, with 22% of the domestic market share.  It is engaged in the manufacturing, distribution, and retail sales of footwear products. It offers a number of brand names, including Belle, Staccato, Teenmix, Tata, Fato, JipiJapa, Joy & Peace, and Bata.  As of its IPO in May 2007, the company had 3,828 retail outlets in 150 cities in China and 35 in Hong Kong, Macau and the US.  In September 2008, Belle was named No. 8 in the BusinessWeek Asia 50, Businessweek's annual ranking of top Asian companies.

History
Belle's founder and chairman, Tang Yiu, started Lai Wah Footwear Trading Ltd. in 1981 in Hong Kong. He started Belle International in 1991 as a shoe wholesale manufacturer, and the company expanded into retail in 2004.  It attracted private equity investors including Morgan Stanley and domestic Chinese private equity manager CDH. In May 2007 Belle raised $1.1 billion in an IPO on the Hong Kong Stock Exchange. The offering was priced at the top of the range, at 31 times its estimated 2007 earnings, after retail investors ordered more than 500 times the shares initially earmarked for them. According to the IPO prospectus, an investment company linked to Groupe Arnault, parent of French luxury goods group LVMH, purchased $30 million worth of shares as a strategic corporate investor. Belle raised an additional $775 million in two secondary listings in November 2007 and April 2008, which it used to buy several competing brands.

In 2007, Belle reported profits of $291 million (up 102% over 2006) on sales of $1.7 billion (up 89% over 2006). Its three women's brands - Staccato, Millie's, and Joy&Peace - account for about a 50% share of the $90-$150 shoe segment in China. Non-sports shoes account for 67% of sales, and licensing agreements with global brands make up the remainder. In 2006, Belle International won the contract to be the biggest distributor of Nike and Adidas in China. Belle International also operates other sports and leisure wear brands including Li Ning, Reebok, and Kappa (company).

In 2009, Belle sold its shares in Fila China to ANTA Sports, which Fila China was its subsidiary (owned 85%).

Sportswear distribution represented 39% of the company's sales in 2014. Since 2006, Belle International has been the exclusive distributor for Adidas and Nike in the territory of mainland China. Belle International generates a third of its total sales with this partnership. In addition, Belle International sells the brands Puma, Converse, Reebok, Vans, Bata, Mizuno, Clarks, Mephisto, among others, which account for 5.3% of total sales.

References

External links
 

Belle International Holdings Limited

Companies listed on the Hong Kong Stock Exchange
Retail companies established in 1991
Companies based in Shenzhen
Civilian-run enterprises of China
Chinese brands
Shoe brands
Retail companies of China
Offshore companies of the Cayman Islands
Shoe companies of China
Chinese companies established in 1991